Blanche Lefebvre (or Lefevre) (1847 - 23 May 1871) was a communard active in the Batignolles quarter in the 12th arrondissement of Paris. She died defending the Paris Commune during "bloody week".

Biography 
Blanche Lefebvre was a laundress at the Sainte-Marie des Batignolles laundry. 
She lived at 34, rue des Maris, in the 10th arrondissement.

She was known to always wear a red sash and carry a revolver.

Abbot Paul Fontoulieu, a strongly anti-communard but otherwise generally reliable contemporary, 
described Lefebvre as the "queen" of the podium at the Batignolles - and as a "terrible woman", a "fanatic" who "loved the insurrection as others love a man," 
capable of making any sacrifice for the Commune. He compared her to Théroigne de Méricourt and Charlotte Corday (not, in his opinion, a flattering comparison), and related a story in which she shot dead a Fédéré captain on 22 May for his cowardice in the face of the Commune's looming defeat.

Lefebvre was one of the women who participated in the defence of Place Blanche on 23 May 1871, along with Élisabeth Dmitrieff, Nathalie Lemel, and Julia Béatrix Euvrie. 
on the Batignolles barricade.

Legacy 

A square was created in 2012 with the provisional designation "BY/17". In June 2013, Paris city hall named it "Place Blanche Lefebvre".

Further reading

References 

19th-century French women politicians
Deaths in Paris
1847 births
Communards
1871 deaths
Female revolutionaries